USS Shenandoah was the first of four United States Navy rigid airships. It was constructed during 1922–1923 at Lakehurst Naval Air Station, and first flew in September 1923. It developed the U.S. Navy's experience with rigid airships and made the first crossing of North America by airship. On the 57th flight, Shenandoah  was destroyed in a squall line over Ohio in September 1925.

Design and construction

Shenandoah was originally designated FA-1, for "Fleet Airship Number One" but this was changed to ZR-1. Shenandoah was assembled at Naval Air Station Lakehurst, New Jersey in 1922–1923, in Hangar No. 1, the only hangar large enough to accommodate the ship; its parts were fabricated at the Naval Aircraft Factory in Philadelphia. NAS Lakehurst had served as a base for Navy blimps for some time, but Shenandoah was the first rigid airship to join the fleet.

The design was based on Zeppelin bomber L-49 (LZ-96), built in 1917. L-49 was a lightened Type U "height climber", designed for altitude at the expense of other qualities. The design was found insufficient and a number of the features of newer Zeppelins were used, as well as some structural improvements. The structure was built from a new alloy of aluminum and copper known as duralumin, supplied by Alcoa. Girders were fabricated at the Naval Aircraft Factory. Whether the changes introduced into the original design of L-49 played a part in Shenandoahs later breakup is a matter of debate. An outer cover of high-quality cotton cloth was sewn, laced or taped to the duralumin frame and painted with aluminum dope.

The gas cells were made of goldbeater's skins, one of the most gas-impervious materials known at the time. Named for their use in beating and separating gold leaf, goldbeater's skins were made from the outer membrane of the large intestines of cattle. The membranes were washed and scraped to remove fat and dirt, and then placed in a solution of water and glycerine in preparation for application to the rubberized cotton fabric providing the strength of the gas cells. The membranes were wrung out by hand to remove the water-glycerine storage solution and then rubber-cemented to the cotton fabric and finally given a light coat of varnish. The 20 gas cells within the airframe were filled to about 85% of capacity at normal barometric pressure. Each gas cell had a spring-loaded relief valve and manual valves operated from the control car.

Pioneer of helium-filled rigids
As the first rigid airship to use helium rather than hydrogen, Shenandoah had a significant edge in safety over previous airships. Helium was relatively scarce at the time, and Shenandoah used much of the world's reserves just to fill its  volume. —the next rigid airship to enter Navy service, originally built by Luftschiffbau Zeppelin in Germany as LZ 126—was at first filled with the helium from Shenandoah until more could be procured.

Six engines were originally installed, but in 1924 one engine (aft of the control car) was removed. The first frame of Shenandoah was erected by 24 June 1922; on 20 August 1923, the completed airship was floated free of the ground. Helium cost $55 per thousand cubic feet at the time, and was considered too expensive to simply vent to the atmosphere to compensate for the weight of fuel consumed by the gasoline engines. Neutral buoyancy was preserved by installing condensers to capture the water vapor in the engine exhaust.

Service history

Early naval service

Shenandoah first flew on 4 September 1923. It was christened on 10 October 1923 by Marion Bartlett Thurber, wife of the Secretary of the Navy, and commissioned on the same day. Mrs. Denby named the airship after her home in the Shenandoah Valley of Virginia, and the word "shenandoah" was then believed to be a Native American word meaning "daughter of stars".

Shenandoah was designed for fleet reconnaissance work of the type carried out by German naval airships in World War I. Her pre-commissioning trials included long-range flights during September and early October 1923, to test her airworthiness in rain, fog and poor visibility. On 27 October, Shenandoah celebrated Navy Day with a flight down the Shenandoah Valley and returned to Lakehurst that night by way of Washington and Baltimore, where crowds gathered to see the new airship in the beams of searchlights.

At this time, Rear Admiral William A. Moffett, Chief of the Bureau of Aeronautics and staunch advocate of the airship, was discussing the possibility of using Shenandoah to explore the Arctic. He felt such a program would produce valuable weather data as well as experience in cold-weather operations. With its endurance and ability to fly at low speeds, the airship was thought to be well suited to such work. President Calvin Coolidge approved Moffett's proposal, but Shenandoah'''s upper tail fin covering ripped during a gale on 16 January 1924, and the sudden roll tore her away from the Lakehurst mast, ripping out her mooring winches, deflating the first helium cell and puncturing the second. Zeppelin test pilot Anton Heinen rode out the storm for several hours and landed safely while the airship was being blown backwards. Extensive repairs were needed, and the Arctic expedition was scrapped.Shenandoahs repairs were completed in May, and in mid-1924 was working up its engines and radio equipment to prepare for fleet duty. In August 1924, the airship joined the Scouting Fleet and took part in tactical exercises. Shenandoah succeeded in discovering the "enemy" force as planned but lost contact with it in foul weather. Technical difficulties and lack of support facilities in the fleet forced the ship to depart the operating area ahead of time to return to Lakehurst. Although this marred the exercises as far as airship reconnaissance went, it emphasized the need for advanced bases and maintenance ships if lighter-than-air craft were to take any part in operations of this kind.

Flight across North America

In July 1924, the oiler  put in at Norfolk Naval Shipyard for extensive modifications to become the Navy's first airship tender. Shenandoah engaged in a short series of mooring experiments with Patoka to determine the practicality of mobile fleet support of scouting airships. The first successful mooring was made on 8 August. During October 1924, Shenandoah flew from Lakehurst to California and on to Washington state to test newly erected mooring masts. This was the first flight of a rigid airship across North America.

Later naval career
1925 began with nearly six months of maintenance and ground test work. Shenandoah did not take to the air until 26 June, when it began preparations for summer operations with the fleet. In July and August, it again operated with the Scouting Fleet, successfully performing scouting tasks and being towed by Patoka while moored to that ship's mast.

Crash of Shenandoah

On 2 September 1925, Shenandoah departed Lakehurst on a promotional flight to the Midwest that would include flyovers of 40 cities and visits to state fairs. Testing of a new mooring mast at Dearborn, Michigan, was included in the schedule. While passing through an area of thunderstorms and turbulence over Ohio early in the morning of 3 September, during its 57th flight, the airship was caught in a violent updraft that carried it beyond the pressure limits of its gas bags. It was torn apart in the turbulence and crashed in three main pieces near Caldwell, Ohio. Fourteen crew members, including Commander Zachary Lansdowne, were killed. This included eight members of the crew of the control car (except for Lieutenant Anderson, who escaped before it detached and fell from the airship); two men who fell through holes in the hull; and four mechanics who fell with the engines. There were twenty-nine survivors, who succeeded in riding the three sections of the airship to earth. The largest group was eighteen men who made it out of the stern after it rolled into a valley. Four others survived a crash landing of the central section. The remaining seven were in the bow section which Commander (later Vice Admiral) Charles E. Rosendahl managed to navigate as a free balloon. In this group was Anderson who—until he was roped in by the others—straddled the catwalk over a hole.

The Shenandoah Crash Sites are located in the hillsides of Noble County. Site No. 1, in Buffalo Township, surrounded the Gamary farmhouse, which lay beneath the initial break-up. An early fieldstone and a second, recent granite marker identify where Commander Lansdowne's body was found. The rough outline of the stern is marked with a series of concrete blocks, and a sign marking the site is visible from the freeway. Although the trees have been cut down, a semi-circular gravel drive surrounds their stumps and a small granite marker commemorates the crash. The Nichols house was later destroyed by fire.

Among the survivors was Frederick J. Tobin, who would later command the Navy landing party for the arrival of the zeppelin Hindenburg on May 6, 1937 when the airship   exploded into flames and lead rescue operations in response.

Aftermath

Looting
The crash site attracted thousands of visitors in its first few days.  Within five hours of the crash more than a thousand people had arrived to strip the hulk of anything they could carry.  On Saturday, 5 September 1925, the St. Petersburg Times of Florida reported that the site of the crash had quickly been looted by locals, describing the frame as being "[laid] carrion to the whims of souvenir seekers". Among the items believed to have been taken were the vessel's logbook and its barograph, both of which were considered critical to understanding how the crash had happened.  Also looted were many of the ship's 20 deflated silken gas cells, each worth several thousand dollars, most of them unbroken but ripped from the framework before the arrival of armed military personnel.  Looting was so extensive that it was initially believed even the bodies of the dead had been stripped of their personal effects, and that operatives from the Department of Justice were being sent to investigate.  That this was happening was soon denied by those publicly involved in the incident, however.  Still, a local farmer on whose property part of the vessel's wreckage lay began charging the throngs of visitors to enter the crash site at a rate of $1 (equivalent to about $13.60 in 2015) for each automobile and 25¢ per pedestrian as well as 10¢ for a drink of water.

On 17 September the Milwaukee Sentinel reported that 20 Department of Justice operatives had indeed been summoned to the site and that they along with an unspecified number of federal and state prohibition agents had visited private homes to collect four truck loads of wreckage along with personal grips of several crew members and a cap believed to have belonged to Commander Lansdowne. Lansdowne's Annapolis class ring had also been thought to have been taken from his hand by looters as it was not then recovered-it was found by chance in June 1937 near the crash site # 1. No one was charged with any crime.

Inquiry

The official inquiry brought to light the fact that the fatal flight had been made under protest by Commander Lansdowne (a native of Greenville, Ohio), who had warned the Navy Department of the violent weather conditions that were common to that area of Ohio in late summer. His pleas for a cancellation of the flight only caused a temporary postponement: his superiors were keen to publicize airship technology and justify the huge cost of the airship to the taxpayers. So, as Lansdowne's widow consistently maintained at the inquiry, publicity rather than prudence won the day. This event was the trigger for Army Colonel Billy Mitchell to heavily criticize the leadership of both the Army and the Navy, leading directly to his court-martial for insubordination and the end of his military career. Heinen, according to the Daily Telegraph, placed the mechanical fault for the disaster on the removal of eight of the craft's 18 safety valves, saying that without them he would not have flown on her "for a million dollars".  These valves had been removed in order to better preserve the vessel's helium, which at that time was considered a limited global resource of great rarity and strategic military importance; without these valves, the helium contained in the rising gas bags had expanded too quickly for the bags' valves' design capacity, causing the bags to tear apart the hull as they ruptured (the helium which had been contained in these bags became lost into the upper atmosphere).

After the disaster, airship hulls were strengthened, control cabins were built into the keels rather than suspended from cables, and engine power was increased. More attention was also paid to weather forecasting.

Memorials

Several memorials remain near the crash site. There is another memorial at Moffett Field, California, and a small private museum in Ava, Ohio.

The Noble Local School District—which serves the area where Shenandoah crashed—has named its elementary, junior high, and high school after Shenandoah. Their sports teams are named "The Zeps," an abbreviation of "Zeppelin." The truck stop has since closed and has been torn down.

In popular culture 
The crash of the Shenandoah was popularized by the songs The Hand of Fate, written in 1925 by Eugene Spencer and Don Drew, and The Wreck of the Shenandoah which was written by Vernon Dalhart and Carson Robison. The latter song was also issued as a record with Vernon Dalhart performing it.Massey, Guy, and Carson Robison. Wreck of the Shenandoah. [U.S.]: Pathé Actuelle, 1925.

See also
List of airships of the United States Navy

References

Further reading

MacSwords, J. R. "15 dead in blimp disaster: lightning flash, terrific storm; Shenandoah wages losing battle with elements." The Times Recorder, Zanesville, Ohio 4 September 1925
Wood, Junius B., "Seeing America from the 'Shenandoah'", National Geographic, January 1925Ill Wind: The Naval Airship Shenandoah in Noble County, Ohio. Gray, Lewis.  Gateway Press: Baltimore, 1989
Robinson, Douglas H., and Charles L. Keller. "Up Ship!": U.S. Navy Rigid Airships 1919–1935. Annapolis, Maryland: Naval Institute Press, 1982. 
Keirns, Aaron J. "America's Airship Disaster": The Crash of the USS Shenandoah Howard, Ohio: Little River Publishing. 
Hayward, John T., VADM USN "Comment and Discussion" United States Naval Institute Proceedings August 1978
"The Shenandoah Adventure" A Brief Official Account of the Accident Flight'' 21 February 1924, pp. 101–102

External links

USS Shenandoah at Airships.net: Photos and History
history.navy.mil: USS Shenandoah (ZR-1)
Naval Historical Center Article and Images of Construction
Article and Images during Service
Aviation: From Sand Dunes to Sonic Booms, a National Park Service Discover Our Shared Heritage Travel Itinerary
'The Wreck of the ''Shenandoah''', 1925 song by Vernon Dalhart
Noble County Ohio page on the USS Shenandoah disaster 
America's Forgotten Airship Disaster: The Crash of the USS Shenandoah

Rigid airships of the United States Navy
Noble County, Ohio
1923 ships
1920s United States military trainer aircraft
National Register of Historic Places in Noble County, Ohio
Accidents and incidents involving balloons and airships
1925 in Ohio
Aviation accidents and incidents in the United States in 1925